Message to Love is a feature documentary film of the Isle of Wight Festival 1970. Directed and produced by Murray Lerner, the film includes performances by popular rock acts, such as Jimi Hendrix, the Who, and the Doors, as well as folk and jazz artists, such as Joni Mitchell and Miles Davis. The title of the film is taken from a song by Hendrix.

Due to financial difficulties, Message to Love was not released until 1995, in the UK and 1997, in the USA, after premiering at a San Jose film festival in 1995. A soundtrack album was also issued by Castle Communications/Sony Legacy in 1997.

Background
The film often comically depicts the myriad problems associated with the chaotic festivalthe main program of which was held on 26–30 August 1970including gate-crashing, numerous crowd incursions onto the stage, Kris Kristofferson being booed offstage, and head promoter Rikki Farr's rants against the audience, which only intensified as the situation deteriorated: "We put this festival on, you bastards, with a lot of love! We worked for one year for you pigs! And you wanna break our walls down and you wanna destroy it? Well you go to hell!"  In addition, several near-riots occurred over the price of tickets, as well as during several of the performances that took place over the weekend, especially Jimi Hendrix's last billed performance in England.

Production
The filming used eight cameras, and took 175 hours of 16mm and 35mm Ektachrome footage, which was later edited down to approx 78 minutes of music and 41 minutes of interviews and announcements. All of the headliners were captured, only Sly Stone and Chicago refused permission to be filmed.

Release
The 1996 version of the film was given a certificate of 15, with the 1999 extended edition being rated 18 for nudity. BBC2 premiered the film for the 25th anniversary of the festival. The VHS was released a month later by Castle. The Region 1 DVD was released in 1997, with the Region 2 DVD being released in 2003 by Castle.

Performances in order of appearance in the film 
Jimi Hendrix: "Message to Love" (Sunday) †
The Who: "Young Man Blues" (Saturday)
Free: "All Right Now" (Sunday)
Taste: "Sinner Boy" (Friday)
Tiny Tim: "There'll Always Be an England" (Saturday)
John Sebastian: "Red Eye Express" (Saturday)
Donovan: "Catch the Wind" (Sunday) snippet
Ten Years After: "I Can't Keep from Crying Sometimes" (Saturday)
The Doors: "When the Music's Over" (Saturday) 
The Moody Blues: "Nights in White Satin" (Sunday)
Kris Kristofferson: "Me and Bobby McGee" (Wednesday)
Joni Mitchell: "Woodstock" (Saturday)
Mitchell: "Big Yellow Taxi"
Miles Davis: "Call It Anything" (Saturday)
Leonard Cohen: "Suzanne" (Sunday)
Emerson, Lake & Palmer: "Pictures at an Exhibition" (Saturday)
Hendrix: "Machine Gun" †
Hendrix: "Voodoo Child (Slight Return)"
Joan Baez: "Let It Be" (Sunday)
Jethro Tull: "My Sunday Feeling" (Sunday)
The Doors: "The End" (Saturday) †
Great Awakening: "Amazing Grace"
Hendrix: "Foxy Lady"
The Who: "Naked Eye"
Bob Dylan: "Desolation Row" (studio version played over the end credits)
" † " indicates songs that are not included on the CD.

Reception

Time Out magazine said "The music is exemplary stuff to anyone who heard it the first time aroundthe Doors, Free, Kris Kristofferson (who eventually stormed off stage), the Who, Miles Davis (silhouetted against the dusk), Jethro Tullbut it's the hilarity of the sound-bites that makes this really worth catching."

TV Guide said "Lerner's sharp, devastingly funny film, which was to be financed by the profits, remained one of its greatest casualtiesuntil now. Lerner managed to capture all the hilarious backstage wheeling and dealing, as well as some of the era's best live music."

The Austin Chronicle said "because Message to Love does such a fine job of underscoring the ideology of a generation in conflict with the commercialism of festivals like Wight, it's easy to forget about the quality performances captured by Lerner over the five days that the festival raged".

Deseret News said "Though the performances are great, the 'warts-and-all' approach the film takes elevates it from being just a good music documentary to a great one." The Independent suggested the film was "twice as entertaining if you fast- forwarded through the music".

Variety magazine said this expertly-edited film had "a far deeper historical insight than similar pics from its original era", adding "images are in good shape, and sound quality is excellent."  At the Boston Society of Film Critics Awards in 1997, the film was nominated for Best Documentary. Rolling Stone placed it at number 21 in their list of the greatest rock documentaries. Vulture.com included the film at number 37 on their list of the best music documentaries of all time. Musicoholics had it at number 37 on their list of Legendary Music Documentaries. It was listed at number five on the list of Top 10 Music Festival Documentaries.

Soundtrack

The Message to Love soundtrack album was released as a 2-CD set in 1997. It also includes dialogue from the film placed in between some of the tracks.

Track listing
Disc one
 Free – "All Right Now" – 4:54
 Jethro Tull – "My Sunday Feeling" – 4:24
 Leonard Cohen – "Suzanne" – 4:27
 Jimi Hendrix – "Foxy Lady" – 5:31
 Hendrix – "Voodoo Child (Slight Return)" – 8:56
 Ten Years After – "Can't Keep from Cryin'/Extension on One Chord" – 11:50
 Kris Kristofferson – "Me and Bobby McGee" – 5:44
 Joni Mitchell – "Big Yellow Taxi" – 3:46
 Mitchell – "Woodstock" – 4:04
 Emerson, Lake & Palmer – "Blue Rondo à la Turk/Pictures at an Exhibition/Drum Solo" – 7:35
 The Doors – "When the Music's Over" – 11:46

Disc two
 The Who – "Young Man Blues" – 5:54
 The Who – "Naked Eye" – 6:23
 Tiny Tim – "There'll Always Be an England" – 1:15
 Taste – "Sinner Boy" – 5:11
 Joan Baez – "Let It Be" – 3:53
 The Moody Blues – "Nights in White Satin" – 5:23
 Donovan – "Catch the Wind" – 3:51
 Family – "Weaver's Answer" – 7:22 (not in the film)
 John Sebastian – "Red Eye Express" – 3:58
 Miles Davis – "Call It Anything" – 14:56
 Great Awakening – "Amazing Grace" – 3:47
 Bob Dylan – "Desolation Row" – 11:43

Legacy
In recent years, Lerner's copious 16mm concert footage has been repurposed to create a wealth of complete-performance DVD releases:
 HendrixBlue Wild Angel (2002)
Miles DavisMiles ElectricA Different Kind of Blue (2004)
The WhoLive at the Isle of Wight Festival 1970 (1998)
Jethro TullNothing Is Easy: Live at the Isle of Wight 1970 (2005)
Emerson, Lake & PalmerThe Birth of a Band: Isle of Wight 1970 (2006)
FreeFree Forever DVD (2006)
The Moody BluesThreshold of a Dream: Live at the Isle of Wight Festival 1970 (2008)
Leonard CohenLeonard Cohen Live at the Isle of Wight 1970 (2009)
TasteLive at the Isle of Wight (2015)
The DoorsLive at the Isle of Wight Festival 1970 (2018)
Joni MitchellBoth Sides Now: Live at the Isle of Wight Festival 1970  (2018)

References

External links
 

American rock music films
Concert films
1997 films
Rockumentaries
Films directed by Murray Lerner
Films shot in England
1996 live albums
1996 compilation albums
Live rock albums
Live jazz albums
Live folk albums
Rock compilation albums
Jazz compilation albums
Folk compilation albums
Sony Music albums
Albums produced by Jon Astley
Albums produced by David Gilmour
Documentary films about music festivals
Isle of Wight Festival
1990s English-language films
1990s American films